The 1995–96 season of the UEFA Cup Winners' Cup was won by Paris Saint-Germain 1–0 in the final against Austrian entrants Rapid Wien in Brussels on 8 May 1996.

The 1995–96 season also saw the return of Yugoslav clubs on the international scene after a three-year ban due to a UN embargo. However, the finalist of Yugoslav national cup, FK Obilić, was eliminated in the qualifying round.

Teams

TH Title Holders

Qualifying round

|}

First leg

DAG-Liepaya awarded 3–0, due to Lantana Tallinn fielding an ineligible player, Andrei Borissov. The score at the moment was 1–2.

Second leg

KR Reykjavík won 4–3 on aggregate.

Sion won 3–2 on aggregate.

Sileks won 3–2 on aggregate.

KS Teuta won 3–1 on aggregate.

Hradec Králové won 14–1 on aggregate.

APOEL won 3–0 on aggregate.

Petrolul Ploieşti won 1–0 on aggregate.

Inter Bratislava won 5–2 on aggregate.

Shakhtar Donetsk won 5–1 on aggregate.

Žalgiris Vilnius won 3–2 on aggregate.

2–2 on aggregate. Ararat Yerevan won on penalties.

Dinamo Batumi won 3–2 on aggregate.

Lokomotiv Sofia won 2–1 on aggregate.

Maccabi Haifa won 6–3 on aggregate.

Molde won 3–2 on aggregate.

DAG-Liepaya won 3–0 on aggregate.

First round

|}

First leg

Second leg

Trabzonspor won 3–2 on aggregate.

Deportivo La Coruña won 8–0 on aggregate.

Real Zaragoza won 5–1 on aggregate.

Club Brugge won 2–1 on aggregate.

3–3 on aggregate. Halmstad won on away goals.

Parma won 4–0 on aggregate.

Paris Saint-Germain won 6–2 on aggregate.

Celtic won 7–2 on aggregate.

Borussia Mönchengladbach won 6–2 on aggregate.

AEK Athens won 4–2 on aggregate.

Everton won 6–3 on aggregate.

Feyenoord won 13–0 on aggregate.

Dynamo Moscow won 4–1 on aggregate.

Hradec Králové won 7–2 on aggregate.

Sporting CP won 4–0 on aggregate.

Rapid Wien won 3–1 on aggregate.

Second round

|}

First leg

Second leg

Deportivo La Coruña won 4–0 on aggregate.

Real Zaragoza won 3–1 on aggregate.

Parma won 4–3 on aggregate.

Paris Saint-Germain won 4–0 on aggregate.

Borussia Mönchengladbach won 5–1 on aggregate.

Feyenoord won 1–0 on aggregate.

1–1 on aggregate. Dynamo Moscow won 3–1 on penalties.

Rapid Wien won 4–2 on aggregate.

Quarter-finals

|}

First leg

Second leg

Deportivo La Coruña won 2–1 on aggregate.

Feyenoord won 3–2 on aggregate.

Paris Saint-Germain won 3–2 on aggregate.

Rapid Wien won 4–0 on aggregate.

Semi-finals

|}

First leg

Second leg

Paris Saint-Germain won 2–0 on aggregate.

Rapid Wien won 4–1 on aggregate.

Final

Top goalscorers
The top goalscorers from the 1995–96 UEFA Cup Winners' Cup are as follows:

See also
1995–96 UEFA Champions League
1995–96 UEFA Cup
1995 UEFA Intertoto Cup

References

External links
 1995–96 competition at UEFA website
 Cup Winners' Cup results at Rec.Sport.Soccer Statistics Foundation
 Cup Winners Cup Seasons 1995-96 – results, protocols

3
UEFA Cup Winners' Cup seasons